Lisa Cross (born 4 April 1978) is a professional British female bodybuilder.

Early life and education
Lisa was born in Rochdale in 1978. She had eating problems that began while studying for her GCSEs. Around the age of 15 she became anorexic. She gained all As and A*s in her GCSEs and then achieved four A-Levels which allowed her to take a degree in Russian and Politics at Birmingham University.

Bodybuilding career

Amateur
Lisa has been weight training since 2003 and has been conditioning for competitive entry since 2008. She first really got into bodybuilding in 2006 while she was living in Japan while she was teaching English. Her boyfriend at the time was a Japanese bodybuilding champion and she started reading up on bodybuilding, such as Negrita Jayde, and started training with weights. In 2007, after she got married, she went to see the 2007 Ms. Olympia competition for their honeymoon and was impressed when she saw female bodybuilders for the first time. Former UK junior champion Lewis Breed oversees her training and pre-contest preparation for bodybuilding.  She competed in her debut competition at the 2009 NABBA England, placing second place behind Jennie Ellam. She then competed at the 2009 NABBA Universe achieving second place to Larissa Cunha. Her best win was first place at the UKBFF British Championships, where she won the Ladies Physique class. On 19 March 2014, she announced that she had been awarded her IFBB pro card and can now compete as a pro.

Professional
Lisa attended her first IFBB professional competition at the 2014 Tampa Pro, where she placed 16th place. In 2015, Alina Popa became her coach and started training at the Armbrust PRO Gym. Her training paid off when she went on to win the 2015 Omaha Pro, the first time a professional British female bodybuilder won an overall professional competition since 1999.

Contest history
2009 NABBA England - 2nd
2009 NABBA Universe - 2nd
2009 UKBFF Hercules - 1st
2010 UKBFF British Championships - 1st
2011 Arnold Amateur Europe - 4th
2011 Women’s World Amateur Championships - 4th (HW)
2013 Arnold Amateur Europe - 2nd
2014 IFBB Tampa Pro - 16th
2015 IFBB Omaha Pro - 1st
2015 IFBB Wings of Strength Rising Phoenix World Championships - 9th
2016 IFBB Tampa Pro - 2nd
 2016 IFBB Wings of Strength Rising Phoenix World Championships – 7th
2017 IFBB Tampa Pro - 2nd
 2017 IFBB WOS Rising Phoenix World Championships – 9th

Personal life
Lisa is bisexual and currently Single. She currently lives in Plymouth. She is a former police officer and English teacher. She speaks English, French, Russian and Japanese. This is due to her time living in France, Russia and Japan. In 2014, she published her first book, the Devil and Disciple – The Temptation. Her sponsors are CNP Professional, Melanotan Europe, and Powerzone Gym Equipment. She runs her own community gym. She is also a hardcore pornographic performer.

See also
Female bodybuilding
List of female professional bodybuilders

References

External links
Lisa Cross Official Biography
Lisa Cross Biography
2009 UKBFF Hercules Competition Photographs
2009 NABBA England Results - Miss Physique, 2nd
2009 NABBA Universe Results - Miss Physique, 2nd
2010 UKBFF British Championships Results - Ladies Physique, 1st
FLEX Magazine (British Edition, April 2010) 

1978 births
Alumni of the University of Birmingham
Bisexual women
British expatriates in Japan
British expatriates in the United States
English female bodybuilders
British female bodybuilders
English LGBT sportspeople
Living people
Sportspeople from Rochdale
Professional bodybuilders
Bisexual sportspeople
LGBT bodybuilders